is a former Japanese football player and manager. He played for Japan national team. He used his name "信藤 克義" until 1992.

Club career
Shinto was born in Hiroshima on September 15, 1960. After graduating from Chuo University, he joined his local club Mazda in 1983. He moved to Mitsubishi Motors (later Urawa Reds) in 1990. He played as regular player. In 1992, founded new league J1 League. However, he lost the opportunity to play in the match. In 1993, he moved to Japan Football League club Fujita Industries (later Bellmare Hiratsuka). The club won the champions in 1993 and was promoted to J1 League. The club won 1994 Emperor's Cup and 1995 Asian Cup Winners' Cup. He retired in 1995.

National team career
On May 27, 1987, Shinto debuted for Japan national team against Senegal. He played at 1988 Summer Olympics qualification, 1990 World Cup qualification and 1990 Asian Games. He played 15 games and scored 1 goal for Japan until 1990.

Coaching career
After retirement, Shinto started coaching career at Bellmare Hiratsuka in 1996. In 1999, he moved to Toho Titanium. In 2001, he signed with Yokohama FC and became a manager. In 2002 season, the club finished at bottom place and he resigned end of the season.

Club statistics

National team statistics

Managerial statistics

References

External links
 
 Japan National Football Team Database
 
 

1960 births
Living people
Chuo University alumni
Association football people from Hiroshima Prefecture
Japanese footballers
Japan international footballers
Japan Soccer League players
J1 League players
Japan Football League (1992–1998) players
Sanfrecce Hiroshima players
Urawa Red Diamonds players
Shonan Bellmare players
Japanese football managers
J2 League managers
Yokohama FC managers
Footballers at the 1990 Asian Games
Association football defenders
Asian Games competitors for Japan